The 1980 European Weightlifting Championships were held at the Pinki Hall in Belgrade, SFR Yugoslavia from April 26 to May 4, 1980. This was the 59th edition of the event. There were 156 men in action from 26 nations.

Medal summary

Medal table
Ranking by Big (Total result) medals

References
Results (Chidlovski.net)
 М. Л. Аптекарь. «Тяжёлая атлетика. Справочник.» — М.: «Физкультура и спорт», 1983. — 416 с. 

European Weightlifting Championships
European Weightlifting Championships
European Weightlifting Championships
International weightlifting competitions hosted by Yugoslavia
International sports competitions in Belgrade
European Weightlifting Championships
European Weightlifting Championships
1980s in Belgrade